Harris's sparrow (Zonotrichia querula) is a large sparrow. Their breeding habitat is the north part of central Canada (primarily the Northwest Territories and Nunavut, ranging slightly into northern Manitoba and Saskatchewan), making it Canada's only endemic breeding bird.  In the winter they migrate to the Great Plains states of the United States, from southern South Dakota to central Texas. The common name of this species commemorates the American amateur ornithologist Edward Harris (1799–1863).

Description
This species is the largest of the sparrows in the family Passerellidae, though other superficially dissimilar species in the family may slightly exceed them in size.

This is a very distinctive looking species. Breeding plumage birds have conspicuous pink bills and black on the crown, face, throat and upper breast, contrasting with grey on the sides of the head and neck. The back is brown, overlaid with heavy black streaking. There are two white wing bars. Breeding birds have white lower underparts with some black mottling on flanks. Non-breeding adults are more buffy than grey and brown, with reduced or absent black markings and often have whitish scalloping on the head and throat. Immatures have less black than all adult plumages, normally marked with a white chin and throat, a black malar stripe and a broad smudgy black breast-band. Juveniles have a brownish crown streaked with black and fine dark streaks and some broader black markings on the underside. Birds moult from July to September. Confusion of wintering birds is possible with the winter Lapland longspur (Calcarius lapponicus) but that species is much shorter-tailed with white outer rectrices, has rich rufous in greater coverts, and is strictly terrestrial on open ground.

The song of the Harris's sparrow is usually delivered from a high perch. The song consists of a series of one or more clear high wavering whistles followed by another series in higher or lower pitch. They have also been known to call out a strong, metallic chink, as well as some variable musical twittering.

Habitat
The Harris's sparrow breeds in stunted coniferous forests and adjacent scrubs, especially areas of the grand boreal forests where stands of spruce abut mossy bogs. They often nest near the northern limit of tree growth in the forest-tundra ecotone. Typical plant life in the breeding grounds consist of white and black spruce (Picea glauca and P. mariana) and American larch (Larix laricina), dwarf birch-willow, and wet sedge meadow and shrubby tundra with dwarf ericad/lichen plant life. The species migrates mainly through tallgrass prairies to winter in open woodlands, woodland edges and clearings, hedgerows, dense riparian thickets and around brush piles. The Harris's sparrow regularly occurs at feeders in suburban and rural gardens during the wintertime. They typically avoid dry shortgrass prairies and dense woods during winter. Migrating sparrows may be attracted to marsh elder (Iva annua) and giant ragweed (Ambrosia trifida).

Behaviour

Migration
Spring migration commences around late February with birds arriving on breeding grounds by May. Sparrows arrive on their wintering grounds as early as late October, though mostly during November and early December. Records from Banff National Park suggest Harris's sparrows use mountain valleys as migration routes. Apparently, fall migration is less strict than spring migration as Harris's sparrows regularly wander about prairie provinces in Canada until harsh weather forces them south.

Feeding ecology
The Harris's sparrow generally feeds on the ground, scratching vigorously in the leaves and soil for food. Observed foraging during nesting was 85% ground-gleaning. During the breeding season individuals typically forage alone or with a mate. Primary in the diet (66% of stomach contents of breeding birds) are seeds, largely of Carex sedges, grasses and Scirpus bulrush. Also important in the breeding season diet are fruits, largely black crowberry (Empetrum nigrum), mountain bearberry (Arctostaphylos alpina) and various Vaccinium species. Pine needles, flower buds and blossoms are eaten supplementally. Larval invertebrates are important from June to September in the diet, as available prey becomes more common at this point. The principal preferred animal prey includes beetles, flies, bees, ants, moths, butterflies, spiders, cicadas, aphids and leafhoppers. The diet of wintering Harris's sparrow is less well-known and has not been quantitatively studied.

Sociality
Males of this species often group together to sing at dusk. In winter flocks, Harris's sparrows maintain linear dominance hierarchies that determine access to food and roost sites. The most dominant birds are the oldest males which usually also have the largest bibs. "Jump fights" between males occasionally occur, consisting of birds facing off, then leaping at each other, pecking, clawing and beating each other with wings. Testosterone alone does not affect the dominance status of winter birds. If first winter birds have their feathers dyed black, creating an artificially large bib, they rise in the dominance hierarchy past females and other young males. It is usually found in flocks up to several dozen in winter, individuals regularly wandering outside of the "normal" range and turning up in flocks of other sparrow species.

Reproduction
Nests are usually constructed in early to mid-June. Eggs are usually laid by late June to July, depending on when snow in their habitat completely melts. In this species, nests are placed in a well-hidden spot on the ground underneath a thick bush or small conifer or in mossy depression in thick grass clumps. Both parents build a cup nest out of twigs, grass, moss and lichens and line it with fine grasses. From three to five eggs are laid, being variably greenish or greyish in colour with differing degrees of small reddish-brown spot. The incubation stage lasts for approximately 13.5 days. The chicks weigh about  upon hatching. The young will fledge in about 8 to 10 days, from July 4 to July 13. About 3 weeks after fledging, the young become independent of their parents. Second clutches may be laid if the first is destroyed, usually prolonging the brooding period a further three days for the parent sparrows. The species is arguably the least studied North American sparrow due to its isolated nesting territory. The first nest ever found was discovered 1931 in Churchill, Manitoba by ornithologist George M. Sutton, 91 years after the species was initially described.

Longevity and mortality
The Harris's sparrow has lived for up to 11 years and 8 months in the wild. Predators on the nest can including varied terrestrial mammals, including Arctic ground squirrels (Spermophilus parryii) and stoats (Mustela erminea). Harris's sparrows provide an easy target for these predators due to the location of their nests on the ground. Canada jays (Perisoreus canadensis), northern shrikes (Lanius excubitor) and merlins (Falco columbarius) can be a serious predators at the nest (including both nestlings and adults). Shrikes, sharp-shinned hawks (Accipiter striatus) and great horned owls (Bubo virginianus) are known predators of wintering Harris's sparrows. As an anti-predator adaptation, Harris's sparrows fly up into trees when startled by other animals, usually issuing an alarm call in the process (weenk). They duck down to the ground when threatened by other birds. They also produce alarm calls when threatened to alert others.

Conservation status
This species is classified as being of near threatened by the IUCN. The total breeding population is estimated at about 2 million individuals. However, the species came to be included on the "Audubon Watchlist" because there appears to have been a decline in the number of birds observed in annual Christmas Bird Counts across North America. The species is fairly adaptable in wintering habitat and feeding opportunities and its habitat is isolated enough to be out of reach for heavy human development, which makes the recent declines something of a mystery. The species breeds on the northern edge of boreal forests and it is possible that habitat change in their breeding range is affecting this sparrow. The boreal forest, beyond heavy logging, has been adversely affected by increased wildfire and declining soil quality, both of which are likely correlated to global climate change.

References

 Sparrows and Buntings: A Guide to the Sparrows and Buntings of North America and the World by Clive Byers & Urban Olsson. Houghton Mifflin (1995). .

Further reading
 Norment, C. J. Ph.D. (2007). Return to Warden's Grove: Science, desire, and the lives of sparrows. Iowa City, IA: University of Iowa Press.
 Norment, C. J. and S. A. Shackleton. 1993. Harris’s Sparrow (Zonotrichia querula). In The Birds of North America, No. 64 (A. Poole and F. Gill, Eds.). Philadelphia: The Academy of Natural Sciences; Washington, D.C.: The American Ornithologists’ Union.

External links

Harris's sparrow species account - Cornell Lab of Ornithology
Harris's sparrow - Zonotrichia querula - USGS Patuxent Bird Identification InfoCenter
Harris's sparrow photo gallery VIREO

Harris's sparrow
Birds of Canada
Harris's sparrow